Below are the squads for the 2003 Bandy World Championship final tournament in Russia.

Group A

Finland

Kazakhstan

Norway

Russia

Sweden
Coach: Kenth Hultqvist

References

Bandy World Championship squads